IEC connectors are electrical power connectors specified by IEC standards.

The term may refer to connectors specified by:

IEC 62196, for electric vehicles
IEC 60309, for industrial purposes
IEC 60320, for appliance coupling, up to 250 V AC
IEC 60906-1, up to 250 V AC
IEC 60906-2, up to 125 V AC 
IEC 60906-3, safety extra-low voltage,  6 V, 12 V, 24 V, 48 V AC and DC